"Aftershock" is a song by American electronic music group Cash Cash, it was released by Beatport on 29 January 2016 as the sixth single for their fourth studio album, Blood, Sweat & 3 Years. The song features Jacquie Lee, the runner-up of season 5 of NBC's singing competition, The Voice.

"Aftershock" has gained over three billion streams on Spotify.

Background
According to Cash Cash, "the lyrics, the melody, the synth riff, and the emotion they evoke all together" were worked on first; "everything else was secondary." The aforementioned American electronic music group has stated that the recording process for the song "was a total vacation from the way they had been working lately." Cash Cash revealed the song's cover art and release date via Twitter on 21 January 2016.

Critical reception
EDM Sauce praised Jacquie Lee's "beautiful vocals" on the track, and opined,
"from the early days of 'Take Me Home' to this latest release in 'Aftershock.' Cash Cash never disappoints.

Music video
The official music video for the song was uploaded to Cash Cash's official YouTube channel on 16 March 2016.

Track listing

Other remixes
On 31 March 2016, Justin Caruso released a remix for the song. Truse Tarzan has also released a remix for the song.

Chart performance

References

External links 

2016 songs
Cash Cash songs
Songs written by Erin Beck
2016 singles
Big Beat Records (American record label) singles